Cobitis paludica is a species of ray-finned fish in the family Cobitidae.
It is found in Portugal and Spain. Its natural habitats are rivers and intermittent rivers. It is threatened by habitat loss.

References

Sources

External links 
 

Cobitis
Endemic fish of the Iberian Peninsula
Taxa named by Fernando de Buen y Lozano
Fish described in 1930
Taxonomy articles created by Polbot